Work 1989–2002 is a compilation album by the British electronica duo Orbital, released in 2002. It features a selection of singles and rare tracks from their career. Work was Orbital's final album for FFRR.

The album
"Chime", "Choice", "Satan" and "Belfast" were previously released (in different forms) on the US version of Orbital (1991). The version of "Satan" was released on the Spawn soundtrack. "Lush", "Impact" and "Halcyon" appeared on the Brown Album. "Are We Here?" appeared on Snivilisation. "The Box" was a single for the In Sides album. "Nothing Left" and "Style" are from the album The Middle of Nowhere. "Funny Break" and "Illuminate" are from The Altogether.

Track listing

References

External links
 

Orbital (band) compilation albums
2002 compilation albums
FFRR Records albums